The 1979 Paris Open was a Grand Prix tennis tournament played on indoor carpet courts. It was the 10th edition of the Paris Open (later known as the Paris Masters). It took place at the Palais omnisports de Paris-Bercy in Paris, France from 29 October through 4 November 1979. First-seeded Harold Solomon won the singles title.

Finals

Singles

 Harold Solomon defeated  Corrado Barazzutti 6–3, 2–6, 6–3, 6–4
 It was Solomon's 3rd title of the year and the 19th of his career.

Doubles

 Jean-Louis Haillet /  Gilles Moretton defeated  John Lloyd /  Tony Lloyd 7–6, 7–6
 It was Haillet's 2nd title of the year and the 3rd of his career. It was Moretton's 2nd title of the year and the 2nd of his career.

References

External links 
 ATP tournament profile
 ITF tournament edition details